Olympia Sofia (Олимпия София) is a Bulgarian women's football club from the capital city Sofia, currently playing in the Bulgarian AFG, the top division of Bulgarian women's football. In 2010–11 season the team wоn the Bulgarian Women's Cup for the first time in its history. In the final match, played on 15 June 2011, Olympia defeated the Bulgarian league champions NSA Sofia 2–3 at the Vasil Levski National Stadium.

Current squad
Galina Tasseva
Natalia Dolgova
Evdokia Raeva
Silvia Staneva
Eva Ivanova
Elena Boichinova
Magdalena Gankova
Ljubov Barutchijska
Bistra Mladenova
Katrin Kurteva
Julia Atanassova
Margaritha Moscopoulou
Korneliya Naydenova
Kalinka Ilieva
Ljubka Assenova
Dimitra Savoupupou
Stigliani Zlitidou
Suzi Arsova
Krassimira Stoeva

References

External links
 Official website

Women's football clubs in Bulgaria
Football clubs in Sofia